The 1st Bihać Infantry Brigade was formed on September 19, 1992, in Kamenica near Bihać, becoming part of the 5th Corps of the Army of the Republic of Bosnia and Herzegovina under the command of then Brigadier General (now Lieutenant General) Atif Dudaković.

Subunits 
The 1st Bihać Infantry Brigade consisted of:
TO detachment with regiments of Orašac, Ćukovi, Kulen-Vakuf and Ripač - 500 to 600 soldiers
TO detachment Centar - Bihać
TO detachment Bakšaiš - Bihać 
TO rocket launcher detachment - Bihać

References
Bejdo Felić: 5th Corps 1992. - 1995.
Dr. N. Thomas & K. Mikulan - The Yugoslav Wars 2

Brigades of the Army of the Republic of Bosnia and Herzegovina